Yevgeniy Alexandrovich Nikulin (Евгений Александрович Никулин) is a Russian computer hacker. He was arrested in Prague in October 2016, and was charged with the hacking and data theft of several U.S. technology companies. In September 2020, he was sentenced to 88 months in prison.

Hacking career
In 2012, Nikulin was alleged to be part of a criminal clique involving a Ukrainian national, Oleksandr Ieremenko.

Arrest
Czech police arrested Nikulin in Prague on October 5, 2016, in connection with the 2012 hacking and data theft of LinkedIn, Dropbox, and Formspring.

According to a report by TV Rain, his arrest may have been the result of a cooperative effort between the U.S. and Sergei Mikhailov (FSB).

U.S. authorities had previously been tipped off about Nikulin in April 2014.

Detention
On November 23, 2016, Russia requested Nikulin's extradition, citing a 2009 case that involved theft from the online payment system WebMoney.

On February 7, 2017, a lawyer for Nikulin claimed that in mid-November 2016, as well as earlier that day, an FBI agent had visited Nikulin in Pankrác Prison and had offered him cash, an apartment, U.S. citizenship, as well as all cyber charges against him dropped, if he would agree to confess to participating in the 2016 Democratic National Committee email leak.

In late March 2018, Paul Ryan visited the Czech capital, where he urged authorities to grant Nikulin's extradition to the U.S.

Extradition
On March 30, 2018, Nikulin was extradited to the U.S., where he pleaded not guilty to the charges against him.

Conviction
On July 10, 2020, Nikulin was convicted by a jury in a United States District Court in San Francisco on all but one of the counts.

Sentencing
On September 29, 2020, Nikulin was sentenced to 88 months in prison.

Controversy
Bryan Paarmaan, who was the then-FBI Deputy Assistant Director in the International Operations Division, admitted to leaking details of Nikulin's indictment to Los Angeles Times reporter, Del Quentin Wilber, two days before Nikulin's indictment was unsealed.

References

Hacking in the 2010s
1987 births
Living people